The Ninth Amendment to the Constitution of Pakistan (Urdu: آئین پاکستان میں نویں ترمیم) would have imposed sharia law as the supreme law of the land by amending Article 2, 203B and 203D of the Constitution of Pakistan.

The Senate passed the bill and sent it to the National Assembly on 7 August 1986. Wasim Sajjad, the Minister for Justice and Parliamentary Affairs, referred the bill to committee. The committee was supposed to submit a report regarding the proposed amendment within 30 days but before the report could be presented, the National Assembly was dissolved and the bill lapsed.

Text

See also
 Zia-ul-Haq's Islamization
 Separation of powers
 Nawaz Sharif
 Benazir Bhutto
 Pervez Musharraf

References

External links
 Full-text of the Ninth Amendment

01
Islamization